Presidential elections were held in Colombia on 29 May 1994, with a second round on 19 June. The result was a victory for Ernesto Samper of the Liberal Party, who received 50.57% of the vote in the run-off.

Samper's election was tainted by accusations during the campaign and afterwards that his Liberal Party had sought funding from the Cali Cartel. This resulted in the Proceso 8000 investigation, which found several of Samper's close associates within the party guilty, although Samper himself was absolved of any wrongdoing. However, the scandal badly damaged his presidency and his party, and resulted in a grand coalition of opposition politicians standing against and defeating the Liberal Party at the following election in 1998; Samper was Colombia's last Liberal president.

Results

References

1994 in Colombia
Presidential elections in Colombia
Colombia